Eleanor of Brittany (1275 – 16 May 1342) was the sixteenth abbess of Fontevrault.

She was born in England to John II, Duke of Brittany and Beatrice of England, and in 1281 at the age of seven entered Amesbury Priory in Wiltshire, a priory of the Fontevrault order (her first cousin, twice removed, Eleanor, Fair Maid of Brittany is buried there). Her grandmother, Eleanor of Provence, decided to live out her retirement at this priory, and had earlier lobbied for Eleanor and another granddaughter, Mary of Woodstock, to join her at Amesbury.

In 1290 she moved to Fontevrault Abbey in the Loire region of France, the parent abbey of the order, where she took her vows and became a nun in March 1291. The richly illuminated Fontevraud Gradual was presented to her upon her induction. In 1304 she became abbess. Soon after 1313, Eleanor's cousin, Mary of Woodstock, was removed from her role as visitor of Amesbury Priory. In 1317, Mary's brother Edward, by now King Edward II of England, asked Eleanor to restore her to the post, but his request was refused. But Mary persevered and obtained a papal mandate requiring her reinstatement, which Eleanor appears to have obeyed. Upon her death in 1342 she bequeathed the gradual to the abbey. It survives to this day and is held by the public library of Limoges.

References 

 Berenice M. Kerr, Religious life for women, c.1100-c.1350 : Fontevraud in England. Oxford: Oxford University Press, 1999.
 Célestin Port, Dictionnaire historique, géographique et biographique de Maine-et-Loire et de l'ancienne province d'Anjou : A-C, t. 1, Angers, H. Siraudeau et Cie, 1965, 2nd edition.

1275 births
1342 deaths
Abbesses of Fontevraud
Anglo-Norman Roman Catholic abbesses
13th-century Breton women
14th-century Breton women
Benedictine nuns
13th-century French nuns
14th-century French nuns
House of Dreux
Amesbury Abbey